The Abhidharmakośabhāsya (lit. Commentary on the Sheath of Abhidharma), Abhidharmakośa for short (or just Kośa or AKB), is a key text on the Abhidharma written in Sanskrit by the Indian Buddhist scholar Vasubandhu in the 4th or 5th century CE. The Kośa summarizes the Sarvāstivādin Abhidharma in eight chapters with a total of around 600 verses and then comments on (and often criticizes) it. This text was widely respected and used by schools of Buddhism in India, Tibet and East Asia. Over time, the Abhidharmakośa became the main source of Abhidharma and Sravakayana Buddhism for later Mahāyāna Buddhists.

In the Kośa, Vasubandhu presents various views on the Abhidharma, mainly those of the Sarvāstivāda-Vaibhāṣika, which he often criticizes from a Sautrāntika perspective. The Kośa includes an additional chapter in prose refuting the idea of the "person" (pudgala) favoured by some Buddhists of the Pudgalavada school.

The Vaibhāṣika master Samghabhadra considered that Vasubandhu had misrepresented numerous key points of Vaibhāṣika Abhidharma in the Kośa, and saw Vasubandhu as a Sautrāntika (upholder of the sutras). However, Vasubandhu often presents and defends the Vaibhāṣika Abhidharma position on certain topics (contra Sautrāntika). Because of this, Chinese commentators like Pu Guang do not see Vasubandhu as either a Vaibhāṣika nor as a Sautrāntika.

Background
The Abhidharmakośabhāsya (AKB) is a work of Abhidharma, a field of Buddhist philosophy which mainly draws on the Sarvāstivāda Abhidharma tradition. This tradition includes various groupings or "schools", the two main ones being Vaibhāṣika and Sautrāntika. The main source for the Vaibhāṣika tradition (which was based in Kaśmīra) is the Abhidharma Mahāvibhāṣa Śāstra. The other main tradition of Sarvāstivāda philosophy were those masters who were called "westerners" (Pāścāttya) or "outsiders" (Bāhyaka) and they were mainly based in Gandhara.

These masters (later known as Sautrāntikas) did not fully accept the Vaibhāṣika philosophy and compiled their own Abhidharma texts, such as the Abhidharma-hṛdaya by Dharmaśrī, which was the first Abhidharma text to provide a series of verses with prose commentary (this is the style that the Kośa follows). This work was very influential on subsequent Abhidharma texts (which imitated its style) and various commentaries were written on it. The Abhidharmakośabhāsya's style and structure is based on these Sautrāntika Abhidharma works.

According to K.L. Dhammajoti, in the AKB, Vasubandhu often favors the opinion of the Sautrāntika school against the Sarvāstivāda Vaibhāṣikas (when there is a dispute). For example, he criticizes the doctrine of the existence of the three times (past, present, future), a central Sarvāstivāda doctrine. However, this is not always the case and he seems to have sometimes also favored certain Vaibhāṣika doctrines (contra Sautrāntika), including the reality of certain mental factors (caittas), the notion of the conjunction of mind and mental factors and also the Sarvāstivāda doctrine of simultaneous causation which was rejected by Sautrantika masters like Śrīlāta.

Content Overview 
The text is divided into the following chapters.

1: The Exposition on the Elements (dhātu-nirdeśa)

2: The Exposition on the Faculties (indriya-nirdeśa)

3: The Exposition on the World (loka-nirdeśa)

4: The Exposition on Karma (karma-nirdeśa) 
Chapter four of the Kośa is devoted to a study of karma, and chapters two and five contain formulation as to the mechanism of fruition and retribution.

5: The Exposition on the Underlying Tendencies (anuśaya-nirdeśa)

6: The Exposition on Paths and Persons (mārgapudgala-nirdeśa)

7: The Exposition on Wisdom (jñāna-nirdeśa)

8: The Exposition on Meditative Attainment (samāpatti-nirdeśa)

9: The Refutation of the View of a Self (atmavāda-pratiṣedha)

The Text and its Translations
The Sanskrit original of the Abhidharmakośabhāṣya was lost for centuries, and was known to scholarship only through Chinese and Tibetan translations. The work was of such importance to the history of Indian thought that in the 1930s, the great scholar Rāhula Sāṅkṛtyāyana (1893–1963) even re-translated the verses into Sanskrit, from Tibetan, and wrote his own Sanskrit commentary on them.  However, during a subsequent visit to Tibet, Sāṅkṛtyāyana discovered an ancient palm-leaf manuscript of 367 leaves that contained not only Vasubandhu's verses, but his lost commentary. In 1967 and then in a revised edition of 1975, Prof. P. Pradhan of Utkal University finally published the original Sanskrit text of the Abhidharmakośabhāṣya, Vasubandhu's great work summarizing earlier traditions of the Vibhāṣā school of Buddhist philosophy.

The Abhidharmakośa-kārikā (the verses) and the Abhidharmakośa-bhāsya (the auto-commentary) were translated into Chinese in the 6th-century by Paramārtha (T1559). They were translated again in the 7th-century by Xuanzang (T1560 & T1558). Other translations and commentaries exist in Tibetan, Chinese, Classical Mongolian and Old Uyghur.

The verses and the commentary were first translated into a European language by Louis de La Vallée-Poussin, published in 1923–1931 in French, which is primarily based on Xuanzang's Chinese translation but also references the Sanskrit text, Paramārtha's Chinese translation, and the Tibetan.

Currently, three complete English translations exist. The first by Leo M. Pruden in 1988 and the second by Gelong Lodrö Sangpo in 2012 are both based on La Vallée-Poussin's French translation. The third by Masahiro Shōgaito in 2014 is a translation of the Uighur translation of Xuanzang's Chinese translation.

Commentaries
There are many commentaries written on this text.

Indian Commentaries 
Indian Buddhist commentaries include:

 Samghabhadra (5th century CE), Abhidharmakośa-śāstra-kārikā-bhāṣya. This is a brief summary of the Abhidharmakośa.
Samghabhadra (5th century CE), Nyāyānusāra. This text critiques Vasubandhu's exposition on numerous points and defends the Vaibhasika orthodox views against Vasubandhu and other Sautrāntikas such as the elder Śrīlāta and his pupil Rāma. It only survives in a Chinese translation by Xuanzang.
 Yashomitra (6th c. CE), Abhidharmakośa-ṭīkā or Abhidharmakośa-sphuṭārthā (chos mngon pa'i mdzod kyi 'grel bshad (don gsal ba)
 Sthiramati (6th c. CE), Abhidharmakoṣa-bhāṣya-ṭīkā-tattvārtha (chos mngon pa mdzod kyi bshad pa'i rgya cher 'grel pa, don gyi de kho na nyid)
 Dignaga (6th c. CE), Abhidharmakośa-vṛtti-marmapradīpa (chos mngon pa'i mdzod kyi 'grel pa gnad kyi sgron ma)
Purnavardhana, Abhidharmakośa-ṭīkā-lakṣaṇānusāriṇī (chos mngon pa mdzod kyi 'grel bshad mtshan nyid kyi rjes su 'brang ba). Purnavardhana was a student of Sthiramati.
 Purnavardhana, Abhidharmakośa-ṭīkā-lakṣaṇānusāriṇī (2nd commentary, but with same name as the first)
 Śamathadeva (date unknown), Abhidharmakośa-ṭīkopayikā (chos mngon pa'i mdzod kyi 'grel bshad nye bar mkho ba, Derge no. 4094 / Peking no. 5595), a handbook of the Kośa that quotes passages from the Mūlasarvāstivāda Tripitaka.
 Unknown author, Sārasamuccaya-nāma-abhidharmāvatāra-ṭīkā (chos mngon pa la 'jug pa rgya cher 'grel pa snying po kun las btus)

Chinese Commentaries 
According to Paul Demiéville, some of the major extant Chinese commentaries to the Abhidharmakośa include:

 Shen-t'ai, Chü-she lun shu, originally in twenty Chinese volumes, today only volumes 1, 2, 4, 5, 6, 7 and 17 are extant.
 P'u-kuang, Chü-she lun chi (in thirty-volumes, 7th century), which quotes Shen-t'ai. P'u-kuang also wrote a small treatise on the Kosa.
 Fa-pao, Chü-she lun shu, which quotes Shen-t'ai and P'u-kuang.
 Yuan-hui, Chü-she tun sung shu. According to Demiéville, this work was "commented upon several times in China and widely used in Japan; it is from this work that the Mahayanists generally draw their knowledge of the Kośa. But from the point of view of Indology, it does not offer the same interest as the three preceding commentaries."

Two other disciples of Xuanzang, Huai-su and K'uei-chi, wrote commentaries on the Kośa which are lost.

Tibetan Commentaries 

 Chim Lozang Drakpa  (1299-1375), An Ocean of Excellent Explanations Clarifying the Abhidharma Kośa
Chim Jampé Yang (13th century), Ornament of Abhidharma, Chim Jampé Yang was a student of Chim Lozang Drakpa.
 Rongtön Sheja Kunrig (1367-1449), Thoroughly Illuminating What Can be Known. Rongtön was a great scholar of the Sakya school.
Gendün Drup, First Dalai Lama (1391–1474) Illuminating the Path to Liberation
 The Ninth Karmapa Wangchuk Dorje (1556–1603), An Explanation of the Treasury of Abhidharma called the Essence of the Ocean of Abhidharma, The Words of Those who Know and Love, Explaining Youthful Play, Opening the Eyes of Dharma, the Chariot of Easy Practice
 Mipham Rinpoche (1846–1912),
 Jamyang Loter Wangpo (1847-1914), A Lamp Illuminating Vasubandhu's Intention
 Khenpo Shenga (1871–1927), A Mirror for What Can be Known

See also
Abhidharma
Dharma
Sarvastivada
Mulasarvastivada
Kleshas (Buddhism)
Mental factors (Buddhism)

Notes

References

Sources

Printed sources 

 
 
 Vallée Poussin, Louis de la, trad. (1923-1931). L’Abhidharmakosa de Vasubandhu, Paris: Paul Geuthner, Vol. 1, Vol. 2, Vol. 3, Vol. 4, Vol. 5, Vol. 6.
 Pruden, Leo M. (1991), Abhidharmakosabhasyam, translated from the French translation by Louis de la Vallée Poussin, Asian Humanities Press, Berkeley.

Web-sources

External links
 Multilingual edition of the Abhidharmakośa in the Bibliotheca Polyglotta, Web archive:Multilingual edition of the Abhidharmakośa in the Bibliotheca Polyglotta
 Sanskrit text of the Abhidharma-kośa-bhāṣya, with Chinese translations by Paramārtha and Xuanzang (from Peking University)
Sanskrit text of the Abhidharmakośabhāṣya edited by P. Pradhān and published (2ed) in 1975

Abhidharma
Mahayana texts
Early Buddhism
Buddhism in the Heian period
Buddhism in the Nara period